Carla Mendonça (born 1961 in Coventry, Warwickshire) is a British actress. She is known for playing Orla Crawshaw in Coronation Street, Sophie Johnson in the CITV children's sitcom My Parents Are Aliens (2001–2006) and Mrs. Fitzgerald in the CBBC series So Awkward (2015–2018). She has a degree in Theatre Studies and Dramatic Art from the University of Warwick.

Personal life
Mendonça was born in Coventry, West Midlands. Her parents were ballet dancers, her mother from England and her father from Portugal. Her brother, Jorge, was a colonel in the British Army, who served with the First Battalion in the Queen's Lancashire Regiment. Mendonça attended Bishopshalt School, Royal Lane, Hillingdon, Middlesex.

She has been married to actor Clive Mantle since 24 February 2016.

Carla was in the band The Maisonettes.

Filmography

Film

Television

Theatre
Her theatre roles include:

References

External links

www.carlamendonca.com Carla Mendonça's website

1961 births
Living people
Actresses from Coventry
English television actresses
English people of Portuguese descent
Alumni of the University of Warwick